Lancelot is a 1900 opera by Victorin de Joncières to a libretto by Louis Gallet and Édouard Blau. Dedicated to his wife, the opera premiered on 7 February 1900 at the Académie Nationale de Musique, Paris.

References

External links
 

Compositions by Victorin de Joncières
1900 operas
French-language operas
Arthurian operas
Operas
Music dedicated to family or friends